The State Aviation Museum is an aviation museum located next to Zhulyany Airport in Kyiv, Ukraine. The museum offers both aircraft exhibits and interactive displays. The museum is one of the larger aviation museums displaying Soviet technology. 

The museum opened its doors to the public on 30 September 2003, with Yuriy Ziatdinov as curator. Both the premises and the planes are provided by the National Aviation University which continues to use some of the exhibits as educational props on site.

Aircraft on display

See also
Zhulyany Airport
Related lists
List of aerospace museums

References

External links 

State Aviation Museum of Ukraine (Zhulyany)
State Aviation Museum Kyiv
Государственный музей авиации Украины (State Aviation Museum of Ukraine) - Photos from the museum. 

Museums in Kyiv
Aerospace museums in Ukraine
Museums established in 2003